The Santa Clara Swim Club (abbreviated SCSC) is a renowned swimming club and team based in Santa Clara, California. Part of USA Swimming, it is a USA Swimming Silver Medal Club and a part of the Pacific Swimming LSC, sub-governed by Zone 1 South.

Founded in 1951 by George Haines, the team's coach until 1974, the club has many notable alumni, including Donna de Varona, Pablo Morales, Don Schollander, Mark Spitz, Chris von Saltza, Lynn Burke, George Harrison, Tom Bruce, Steve Clark, Claudia Kolb, Joe Bottom, John Hencken, Linda Jezek, Dick Roth, Jan Henne, Tom Wilkens, Linda Gustavson, Greg Buckingham (brother of former guitarist of Fleetwood Mac, Lindsey Buckingham), and Paul Hait. Swimmers from the club have earned 71 Olympic medals: 42 gold, 18 silver, and 11 bronze. In 1966, the City of Santa Clara built the Santa Clara International Swim Center, which became the home of the club. It was renamed the George F. Haines International Swim Center in June 2001 in honor of its founding coach. The Swim Center is also home to the Santa Clara Diving Club.

The Swim Center has hosted the Santa Clara International Grand Prix annually for 42 years. Since its inception, 23 world records, 333 American records, and 64 foreign national records have been set at the meet, including a world record set by Michael Phelps in 2003. The Swim Center has hosted Senior Nationals, Junior Nationals, Western Zone Championships, Pacific Swimming Far Western Championships, and Masters Nationals.

The Santa Clara Swim Club is known for its history as a successful swim club, and for a time in the 1960s-1970s was widely considered the premier club in the United States. The Club maintains an excelling competitive team under head coach Kevin Zacher (the former coach of Taylor Ruck), preceded by John Bitter (fired because of misappropriated funds), and before that, Dick Jochums. The Masters program is highly popular as well. The president of the board of directors of the team is former Olympian Chris Cavanaugh. The annual Santa Clara International Grand Prix continues to regularly attract Olympian athletes including Michael Phelps.

References

 Santa Clara Swim Club website
 Gary Wiens, "Michael Phelps at Santa Clara Swim Club", Metblogs - San Jose, June 11, 2009
 Santa Clara Diving Club website

Sports in Santa Clara, California
Swimming clubs